Portola is a 1998 album by singer songwriter Rose Melberg. The album was released by Double Agent Records in August 1998.

Track listing
"Deep Purple" (Peter DeRose) - 2:40
"Golden Gate Bridge" - 2:33
"Happy Birthday to Me" - 1:42
"Devoted to You" (Boudleaux Bryant) - 2:11
"Loose Talk" (Carl Smith) - 2:54
"Another Cup of Coffee" - 2:53
"Stitch" - 2:57
"I Will" (Lennon/McCartney) - 1:49
"My Heaven, My Sky" - 1:29
"Mr. Spaceman (Jim McGuinn)" - 3:30
"The Love We Could Have Had" - 2:08

References

1998 albums